Nazrana may refer to:

 Nazrana (1942 film), an Indian film
 Nazrana (1961 film), an Indian film
 Nazrana (1987 film), an Indian film